Westringia lucida, also known as Shining Westringia, is a species of plant in the mint family that is endemic to Australia.

Description
The species grows as a dense shrub to 0.5 m in height. The oval leaves are about 8–14 mm long and 5–8 mm wide, appearing in whorls of three. The flowers appear in early summer; they are white with small orange-red dots.

Distribution and habitat
The species is found in the Australian Alps IBRA bioregion in south-eastern New South Wales and north-eastern Victoria, from Kosciuszko National Park to the vicinity of Mount Bogong, in rocky areas with snow gum woodland or alpine heath.

References

lucida
Lamiales of Australia
Flora of New South Wales
Flora of Victoria (Australia)
Plants described in 1949